Cockfield railway station was on the Long Melford-Bury St Edmunds branch line in Cockfield, Suffolk.

The station building still stands, but is in a semi-derelict state.

References

External links
 Cockfield station on navigable 1946 O.S. map
 Cockfield station on Subterranea Britannica

Disused railway stations in Suffolk
Former Great Eastern Railway stations
Railway stations in Great Britain opened in 1865
Railway stations in Great Britain closed in 1961
Cockfield, Suffolk